Mahlon Morris Garland (May 4, 1856 – November 19, 1920) was a Republican member of the U.S. House of Representatives from Pennsylvania.

Early life and career
Garland was born in Pittsburgh, Pennsylvania.  He moved with his parents to Alexandria, Pennsylvania.  He learned the trade of puddling and heating, and joined the Amalgamated Association of Iron, Steel and Tin Workers, and later became president for the organization.  He was a member of the select council of Pittsburgh in 1886 and 1887.

Political career
He was appointed by President William McKinley as the United States Collector of Customs (then called surveyor of customs) at Pittsburgh in 1898.  He was reappointed by President Theodore Roosevelt in 1902 and 1906 and by President William Taft in 1910, serving until March 3, 1915.

He served as vice president of the American Federation of Labor, as member of the Pittsburgh School Board, and as a member of the borough council of Edgewood, Pennsylvania.

Congress
Garland was elected as a Republican to the Sixty-fourth, Sixty-fifth, and Sixty-sixth Congresses and served until his death.  He served as Chairman of the United States House Committee on Mines and Mining during the Sixty-sixth Congress.

He had been reelected to the Sixty-seventh Congress, but died in Washington, D.C., before the session began.  Interment in Woodlawn Cemetery in Pittsburgh.

See also
List of United States Congress members who died in office (1900–49)

Sources

The Political Graveyard
Mahlon M. Garland, late a representative from Pennsylvania, Memorial addresses delivered in the House of Representatives and Senate frontispiece 1922

1856 births
1920 deaths
Politicians from Pittsburgh
People from Huntingdon County, Pennsylvania
American Federation of Labor people
Ironworkers
Republican Party members of the United States House of Representatives from Pennsylvania